Wembezi is a small township at Estcourt in Uthukela District Municipality in the KwaZulu-Natal province of South Africa.

HISTORY

Rich in political history especially for the ANC and IFP warfare that took place claiming life of a lot of people.

Way back Wembezi was a IFP area but changed with the introduction of ANC first being known at Depo Section and spreading to other sections namely 5Room and VQ section.

Politically now there are few parties at Wembezi being: ANC as ruling and NFP, IFP with a few of EFF and Aljama

SECTIONS

Wembezi has about 11 sections with the small Townships

 Long Homes : A suburban kind of area - home to well known Zola Primary school - new cemetery is close to this section. Estcourt educational circuit office is here
 Estcourt
 Mahhashini : home to Wembezi only surgery Dr Thulani and a police station near by
 Gunawugi : Notorious for being old fashioned and traditional. 
 JZ : this is RDP houses built  during Jacob Zuma's presidency hence name  JZ - above JZ is old cemetery
 VQ : The most vibrant and energetic section. Has two famous alcohol outlets Kwa Nana (Ntokozo's Tarvan) aka Kwa Mdala emakasini and Kwa Thami where we dance until 5AM.
 Nkwezela : Home to gangsters of Wembezi. They stab you straight no jokes
 C section : Kwa fela ubhala (Where you die for no reason) a dangerous and notorious area full of trigger happy guys.
 Depo section : Old depot station for buses, founding section for ANC and home to ANC's renowned veteran Baba Mkhize. Home to oldest High school in entire Township Wembezi High School
 5 Room - Only section that has 5 room building built by government back than. Hosts Wembezi Stadium and oldest Church Emaromini
 Russia - A small 2 street area within Depo
 Bantwana _ A small area in between VQ and Stadium

References

Populated places in the Inkosi Langalibalele Local Municipality
Townships in KwaZulu-Natal